The Radial Road or RR are roads identified as the main connecting roads between inner ring road and outer ring road in Hyderabad, Telangana India. It was built for better connectivity between city roads.

Overview

The project aimed at giving better connectivity plans to extend the existing Ring Roads (inner/outer) to 4/6 lanes.

On the initiation of the (HMDA), the two radial roads to be extended include the roads, as of January, 2012, from Shaikpet to Kokapet(outer ring road/ORR) and Radhika Theatre to Yadgarpally outer ring road via Thumkunta. The project is being assisted financially by the (JICA). Work on another three roads are already in progress. According to HMDA's survey, altogether 33 radial roads will be required to ensure smooth traffic flow from the inner to outer ring road.

More construction of radial roads will be coming up in the forthcoming months, and according to HMDA on the completion of the targeted 158 km radial roads, a much smoother linkage between the inner and outer ring road is expected. As the total project cost comes to Rs. 2,500 crores as against available funds of only 380 crores loaned by JICA, the works will be executed phasewise with support from other agencies like the Roads and Building Department, Municipal Administration, and urban development departments.

The proposed 159 km long outer ringroad project envisages to ease the traffic jams around the cities and encompasses towns like, Patancheru – Shamshabad- Hayathnagar- Medchal- Patancheru also linking other National Highways, State Highways, MDRs and other roads. The Government of Telangana has initiated a new department called Hyderabad Growth Corridor Ltd (HGCL), to implement and supervise this project.

Radial Roads

See also 

Unified Metropolitan Transportation Authority, Hyderabad (India)
Inner Ring Road, Hyderabad
Radial Roads, Hyderabad (India)
Elevated Expressways in Hyderabad
Intermediate Ring Road, Hyderabad (India)
Outer Ring Road, Hyderabad
Regional Ring Road

References

Roads in Hyderabad, India
Japan International Cooperation Agency